Philip N. Klein is an American computer scientist and professor at Brown University. His research focuses on algorithms for optimization problems in graphs.  

Klein is a fellow of the Association for Computing Machinery and a recipient of the National Science Foundation's Presidential Young Investigator Award (1991). He is a recipient of Brown University's Philip J. Bray Award for Excellence in Teaching in the Sciences (2007) and was a Fellow at the Radcliffe Institute for Advanced Study at Harvard University (2015-16). He graduated summa cum laude from Harvard with an A.B. in Applied Mathematics and earned a Ph.D. in Computer Science at MIT.

Key contributions 
 In 1991, Klein and his then-students Ajit Agrawal and R. Ravi gave an approximation algorithm for network design that is considered "the first highly sophisticated use of the primal-dual method in the design of approximation algorithms".
 In 1994, Klein and Robert E. Tarjan gave a randomized linear-time algorithm to find minimum spanning trees, based on a sampling technique due to David Karger.
 In 2005, Klein gave a linear-time algorithm to find a nearly optimal traveling salesman tour in a planar graph.

Books 
Klein has published two textbooks:

References 

Year of birth missing (living people)
Living people
Fellows of the Association for Computing Machinery
Harvard University alumni
Harvard University faculty
Massachusetts Institute of Technology alumni
Brown University faculty
American computer scientists